is a Japanese professional baseball pitcher for the Saitama Seibu Lions of Nippon Professional Baseball (NPB).

External links

 NPB.com

1988 births
Living people
Baseball people from Hyōgo Prefecture
Japanese baseball players
Nippon Professional Baseball pitchers
Saitama Seibu Lions players